Porsche Ring (also known as Audru ringrada, auto24ring, Audru Ring, Pärnu Ring, Sauga Ring and EST-Ring) is a motor racing circuit in Papsaare, near Pärnu, Estonia. It is operated by A2 Racing MTÜ and is the only permanent road circuit in Estonia. The circuit hosts rounds of Baltic Touring Car Championship and other Estonian, Finnish, Baltic and North European Zone events. It is also possible to rent track cars and enjoy different driving experiences or drive your own vehicle (car, motorcycle).

History
The first competitions at the location of the circuit were held in the 1930s. Racing activities at the Kolmnurk ceased in the late 1960s.

A new circuit, designed by Enn Teppand was built in 1989–90. There was also a new section introduced consisting another public road and a short purpose build section.

In 2000, construction of the current circuit begun. The current circuit, opened in 2001, is designed to minimize the use of public roads.

The entire track went through the upgrade in order to meet FIA Grade 3 and FIM Grade B standards.

From August 2021, the circuit is named as Porsche Ring for 5 years.

Gallery

Lap records 

The official race lap records at the Porsche Ring are listed as:

References

External links
  
 auto24ring at etracks
 Auto24Ring at racingcircuits.info
 Map of the whole complex

Motorsport venues in Estonia
Audru Parish
Buildings and structures in Pärnu County